The Rajya Sabha (meaning the "Council of States") is the upper house of the Parliament of India. Arunachal Pradesh elects 1 seat and they are indirectly elected by the state legislators of Arunachal Pradesh, since 1972. Elections within the state legislatures are held using Single transferable vote with proportional representation.

List of all Rajya Sabha Members from Arunachal Pradesh 
Source:

References

External links
Rajya Sabha homepage hosted by the Indian government
Rajya Sabha FAQ page hosted by the Indian government
Nominated members list
State wise list

Arunachal
 
Arunachal Pradesh-related lists

bg:Раджа Сабха
cy:Rajya Sabha
de:Rajya Sabha
fr:Rajya Sabha
gu:રાજ્ય સભા
ko:라자 사바
it:Rajya Sabha
ml:രാജ്യസഭ
mr:राज्यसभा
nl:Rajya Sabha
ja:ラージヤ・サバー
pl:Rajya Sabha
pt:Rajya Sabha
sv:Rajya Sabha
te:రాజ్యసభ